The 2009 FIA GT Oschersleben 2 Hours is the third round of the 2009 FIA GT Championship season. The took place at Motorsport Arena Oschersleben, Germany on 21 June 2009.

Report

Qualifying

Qualifying result
Class winners are highlighted in bold.

† – #59 Trackspeed Racing was disqualified from the GT2 Pole Position after it was found that they had used incorrect tires and that the airbox was not sealed.

Race report
The No. 61 Prospeed Competition Porsche was disqualified from the race after it was discovered in post-race technical inspection that part of its engine did not conform to the homologation requirements for the 997 GT3-RSR.  Prospeed, who had finished second in the GT2 category, appealed the decision, but this appeal was later rejected by the FIA and the results were finalized in October.

Race result
Class winners in bold.  Cars failing to complete 75% of winner's distance marked as Not Classified (NC).

References

Oschersleben 2 Hours
FIA GT Oschersleben